The Best Man Holiday: Original Motion Picture Soundtrack is the soundtrack to the 2013 film of the same name released by RCA Records on October 25, 2013. The album prominently featured the use of Christmas music includes songs by R. Kelly, Jordin Sparks, Mary J. Blige, Monica, Ne-Yo, Marsha Ambrosius, John Legend, Emeli Sandé, and more. It features both original as well as existing tracks. It was made accessible to stream exclusively on ITunes on October 16, 2013, even before the film's album was issued to digital music streamers and was later received a physical release on November 1.

Background 
Lee believed that "music is essential to the entirety of a film going experience [...] The songs listed here not only make up the fabric of the movie, but many served as inspiration to the creation of the screenplay". The creation of the soundtrack was inspired from his experiences on listening to Christmas music and thought on fitting it into the film. The soundtrack featured covers of Christmas songs performed by Stevie Wonder, Nat King Cole and Marvin Gaye. In addition to the covers, he also wrote few Christmas songs into the script while writing the film. He then made a deal with RCA Records, which assembled "a roster of artists that are just fantastic and really would do a great job helping to be the fabric of the movie".

Reception 
Stephen Farber of The Hollywood Reporter wrote "There’s a lot of effective music in the film, though the Christmas standards on the soundtrack are overused." Andrew Barker of Variety called it as an "ace soundtrack full of soulful yuletide tunes", while Drew Taylor of IndieWire called it as "a killer soundtrack full of late-'90s party jams".

Track listing

Charts 

Weekly charts

Year-end charts

References 

2013 soundtrack albums
2013 Christmas albums
RCA Records soundtracks
Albums produced by the Underdogs (production team)
Albums produced by R. Kelly
Albums produced by David Foster
Albums produced by John Legend
Albums produced by Ne-Yo
Various artists albums
Contemporary classical music soundtracks
Rhythm and blues soundtracks